Medical Act is a stock short title used in Malaysia and the United Kingdom for legislation relating to medical practitioners.

List

Malaysia
The Medical Act 1971

United Kingdom
The Medical Act 1956
The Medical Act 1983

The Medical Acts was the collective title of the following Acts:
The Medical Act 1858 (21 & 22 Vict c 90)
The Medical Act 1859 (22 Vict c 21)
The Medical Acts Amendment Act 1860 (23 & 24 Vict c 7)
The Medical Practitioners Act 1876 (39 & 40 Vict c 40)
The Medical Act 1876 (39 & 40 Vict c 41)
The Medical Act 1886 (49 & 50 Vict c 48)

See also
List of short titles

References

Lists of legislation by short title and collective title